The 1904 Northern Illinois State Normal football team represented Northern Illinois State Normal College as an independent in the 1904 college football season. They were led by first-year head coach Dixie Fleager and played their home games at Glidden Field, located on the east end of campus. The team finished the season with a 5–0 record. Alvin Farr was the team's captain.

Schedule

References

Northern Illinois State
Northern Illinois Huskies football seasons
College football undefeated seasons
Northern Illinois State Normal football